The quinoline derivative diiodohydroxyquinoline (INN), or iodoquinol (USAN), can be used in the treatment of amoebiasis.

It is poorly absorbed from the gastrointestinal tract and is used as a luminal amebicide. It acts by chelation of ferrous ions essential for metabolism.

It was discovered by Adco Co. and introduced as diiodohydroxyquinoline.

Susceptibility of Dientamoeba fragilis has been measured.

Iodoquinol is an amebicide used against Entamoeba histolytica, and it is active against both cyst and trophozoites that are localized in the lumen of the intestine. It is considered the drug of choice for treating asymptomatic or moderate forms of amebiasis. The full mechanism of action is unknown. Iodoquinol is used for diseases caused by moderate intestinal amebiasis.

Diodoquin enhances zinc absorption in the zinc deficiency disorder Acrodermatitis enteropathica, probably because Diodoquin act as a zinc ionophore.

See also
 Ionophore

References

Iodoarenes
Quinolinols